Gheybi Sur (also Romanized as Gheybī Sūr; also known as Qaishūr and Qeshūr) is a village in Kowleh Rural District, Saral District, Divandarreh County, Kurdistan Province, Iran. At the 2006 census, its population was 500, in 99 families. The village is populated by Kurds.

References 

Towns and villages in Divandarreh County
Kurdish settlements in Kurdistan Province